Adullam Grove Nature Reserve is a  nature reserve in central Israel, south of Beit Shemesh, managed by the Israel Nature and National Parks Protection Authority.

Nature reserve

The reserve was established in 1994, covering  and was extended to include another  in 2004. The reserve was declared in order to protect Mediterranean forests, woodlands, and scrub that grow naturally in the area.

Archaeology

Horvat Midras (Hebrew) or Khirbet Midras (Arabic), sometimes spelled Madras, dated to the 10th century BCE until approximately the 4th century CE, is located within the boundaries of the reserve. Burial caves, hiding tunnels and caves used during the Bar Kokhba revolt in 132-135 CE, a columbarium, and a burial pyramid were discovered at the site.

Hurvat Itri  - remains of a partially restored Jewish village from the Second Temple period and the Bar Kokhba revolt, containing mikvehs, a synagogue, wine presses, and burial caves.

Hurvat Borgyn - remains of a 2nd-century CE settlement, including fortifications, wells, burial caves, a wine press, and other agriculture oriented finds.

Flora and fauna
Flora include Buckthorn trees (Rhamnus palaestinus), Oak trees, Greek Strawberry trees, Pistacia lentiscus trees, and various types of Cistus and Hyssop.

See also

 Adullam
 Cave of Adullam

References

External links
 profile on The Israel Nature and Parks Authority website 

Nature reserves in Israel
Protected areas of Central District (Israel)